Charles Trimnell (1663–1723) was an English bishop. He was a Whig in politics, and known for his attacks on High Church views, writing on the subordination of the Church of England to the state. After the accession of George I of Great Britain in 1714 he was in the royal favour and influential.

Life
He was the son of another Charles Trimnell (c. 1630–1702), rector of Abbots Ripton, Huntingdonshire. He was educated at Winchester College and New College, Oxford, where he matriculated in 1681, and graduated B.A. in 1688.

Sir John Trevor, Master of the Rolls, gave him an appointment on his graduation, as preacher of the Rolls chapel. He travelled to the Netherlands with Robert Spencer, 2nd Earl of Sunderland in 1689; Sunderland was a Roman Catholic convert of the end of the reign of James II, who returned to England in 1691 as an Anglican Whig, employing Trimnell as chaplain at Althorp. He was rector of Bodington, in Sunderland's gift, in 1694, and of Brington, the local parish of Althorp, in 1696. In 1698 he became archdeacon of Norfolk.

A royal chaplain under Queen Anne, he became rector of Southmere in 1704, and of St Giles' Church, Norwich in 1705. He was rector of St James, Westminster in 1706, and Bishop of Norwich in 1708. In March 1710 he spoke forcefully in the House of Lords for the impeachment of Henry Sacheverell. He preached in 1712 to the House of Lords what Jonathan Swift called a "terrible Whig sermon" in the Journal to Stella, sufficiently controversial that the Lords declined to thank him and order it printed.

He was in high favour on the accession of George I in 1714. He became Clerk of the Closet that same year and Bishop of Winchester in 1721. The Black Act of 1723 was passed at his instigation, to deter poaching of deer at Bishop's Waltham.

Family
By his wife Henrietta Maria, daughter of William Talbot, bishop of Durham, he had two sons who died in infancy. She died in 1716, and in 1719 he married Elizabeth, daughter of Sir Edmund Wynne of Nostell, Yorkshire, second baronet, and widow of Joseph Taylor of the Temple.

References

1663 births
1723 deaths
Bishops of Norwich
Bishops of Winchester
Archdeacons of Norwich
Clerks of the Closet
18th-century Church of England bishops